Croatian Independent Democrats ( or HND) was a political party in Croatia.

History
Its founders were members of the moderate faction within the Croatian Democratic Union. In 1993, their unofficial leaderJosip Manolić, former protégé of President Franjo Tuđman, had been demoted and was becoming increasingly marginalized, while Gojko Šušak, the powerful defense minister and leader of the hardline nationalist faction, was winning Tuđman's favour. Following the rift between the two, Tuđman, in the Spring of 1994, tried to replace Manolić from the position of speaker. Manolić, however, preempted this by convincing a number of HDZ representatives, along with the opposition parties, to support him . Soon, he was joined by the speaker Stjepan Mesić and two of them announced a split from HDZ and the formation of a new party. They accused Tuđman of embracing authoritarianism, extreme nationalism and irredentist policies towards Bosnia and Herzegovina, which was, in their mind, a betrayal of the founding principles of HDZ. From that point onward, HND tried to describe itself as the "genuine" HDZ.

For a while, it looked that HDZ would ultimately lose parliamentary majority, but Tuđman, in the end, managed to keep number of the moderates in line, thus maintaining and later solidifying his grip on power. HND nevertheless managed to replace HDZ governments on local levels, most notably in Zagreb County, an event that would eventually lead to the Zagreb Crisis.

In the 1995 parliamentary elections, it became apparent that HND didn't attract many of HDZ voters, while those already opposed to Tuđman overwhelmingly preferred the established opposition parties. As a result, HND failed to enter the Sabor. This led Mesić to leave the party and join the Croatian People's Party, while Manolić began to try mending ties with HDZ. As a result, HND became marginalized and ceased to exist.

Defunct political parties in Croatia
Political parties established in 1994
Political parties disestablished in 2011
1994 establishments in Croatia